James Eells (October 25, 1926 – February 14, 2007) was an American mathematician, who specialized in mathematical analysis.

Biography
Eells studied mathematics at Bowdoin College in Maine and earned his undergraduate degree in 1947. After graduation he spent one year teaching mathematics at Robert College in Istanbul and starting in 1948 was for two years an instructor at Amherst College in Amherst, Massachusetts. Next he undertook graduate study at Harvard University, where in 1954 he received his Ph.D under Hassler Whitney with thesis Geometric Aspects of Integration Theory.

In the academic year 1955–1956 he was at the Institute for Advanced Study (and subsequently in 1962–1963, 1972–1973, 1977, and 1982). He taught at Columbia University for several years. In 1964 he became a full professor at Cornell University. In 1963 and in 1966–1967 he was at the University of Cambridge, and after a visit to the new mathematics department developed by Erik Christopher Zeeman at the University of Warwick Eells became a professor of mathematical analysis there in 1969. Eells organized many of the University of Warwick Symposia in mathematics.

In 1986 he became the first director of the mathematics section of the Abdus Salam International Centre for Theoretical Physics in Trieste; for six years he served as director in addition to his appointment at the University of Warwick. In 1992 he retired and lived in Cambridge.

Eells did research on global analysis, especially, harmonic maps on Riemannian manifolds, which are important in the theory of minimal surfaces and theoretical physics.  His doctoral students included John C. Wood.

In 1970 he was an invited speaker at the International Mathematical Congress in Nice (On Fredholm manifolds with K. D. Elworthy).

He was co-editor of the collected works of Hassler Whitney. Eells was married since 1950 and had a son and three daughters.

Publications
 
 
 
with J. H. Sampson: 
 
Singularities of smooth maps, London, Nelson 1967
with Luc Lemaire: ; re-published with a follow-up report in the books Harmonic Maps, 1992, and Two Reports on Harmonic Maps, 1994, by publisher World Scientific
with Luc Lemaire: Selected topics in harmonic maps, AMS 1983
with Andrea Ratto: Harmonic maps and minimal immersions with symmetries – methods of ordinary differential equations applied to elliptic variational problems, Princeton University Press 1993
with B. Fuglede: Harmonic maps between Riemannian polyhedra, Cambridge University Press 2001

See also
Eells–Kuiper manifold

References

External links

 Toledo, Domingo. James Eells 1926–2007. Notices Amer. Math. Soc. 55 (2008), no. 6, 704–706.
 Chiang, Yuan-Jen; Ratto, Andrea. Paying tribute to James Eells and Joseph H, Sampson: in commemoration of the fiftieth anniversary of their pioneering work on harmonic maps. Notices Amer. Math. Soc. 62 (2015), no. 4, 388–393.

20th-century American mathematicians
1926 births
2007 deaths
Bowdoin College alumni
Harvard University alumni
Amherst College faculty
Columbia University faculty
Cornell University faculty
Academics of the University of Warwick
Scientists from Cleveland
Mathematicians from Ohio
Geometers
Mathematical analysts